Phialemonium is a genus of fungi in the family Cephalothecaceae of the Ascomycota. The genus was circumscribed by Walter Gams and Michael McGinnis in 1983. The genus is intermediate between Acremonium and Phialophora. It is classified as a dematiaceous (dark-walled) fungus.

Studies 
A study from oxford academy considered Phialemonium specied to have been isolated from air, soil, industrial water, and sewage and although these species rarely cause human disease, infection is often fatal.

References

External links

Sordariomycetes genera
Sordariales